The Communications of the Lunar and Planetary Laboratory was a monographic series that ran from 1962 to 1973 and covered publications and reports by the staff of the Lunar and Planetary Laboratory.

The series is indexed and abstracted in GeoRef and Inspec.

References

External links

Planetary science journals
University of Arizona
Publications established in 1962
Publications disestablished in 1973
English-language journals